Sergio González (born June 10, 1990 in Holguín, Holguín Province)  is a beach volleyball player from Cuba, who won the golden medal in the men's competition at the NORCECA Beach Volleyball Circuit 2009 in Boca Chica and silver in Guatemala, and Cayman Islands partnering Karell Peña.

Playing with Yaismel Borrel, they finished 9th at FIVB Youth at The Hague, Netherlands.

Awards

National Team
 NORCECA Beach Volleyball Circuit Boca Chica 2009  Gold Medal
 NORCECA Beach Volleyball Circuit Guatemala 2009  Silver Medal
 NORCECA Beach Volleyball Circuit Cayman Islands 2009  Silver Medal

References

External links
 
 
 

1990 births
Living people
Cuban beach volleyball players
Men's beach volleyball players
Beach volleyball players at the 2015 Pan American Games
People from Holguín
Olympic beach volleyball players of Cuba
Beach volleyball players at the 2016 Summer Olympics
Pan American Games medalists in volleyball
Pan American Games bronze medalists for Cuba
Beach volleyball players at the 2019 Pan American Games
Medalists at the 2015 Pan American Games